Abu Abdallah Ahmad ibn Muhammad al-Jayhani was a vizier of the Samanid dynasty.

Life
He was a member of the Jayhani family, that provided several officials to the Samanids. As the sources generally refer to these individuals only by their kunya and nisbah, separating the lives and identities of the family members is difficult. Abu Ali was the son and grandson of viziers: his grandfather, Abu Abdallah Muhammad, and his father, Abu Ali Muhammad, both served as viziers under Emir Nasr II, in 914–922 and 937/8–941/2 respectively. 

Abu Abdallah himself was appointed as vizier by Mansur I in 975/6, and remained in office under Nuh II until November/December 977, when he asked to be relieved on account of his advanced age. Like his father, Abu Ahmad is said to have been a convert (or at least sympathetic) to Isma'ilism. He was succeeded by Abu'l-Husain Utbi.

References

Sources
  
 

Samanid viziers
10th-century Ismailis
Converts to Shia Islam